The president of the Soviet Union, officially the president of the Union of Soviet Socialist Republics, abbreviated as president of the USSR, was the head of state of the Union of Soviet Socialist Republics from 15 March 1990 to 25 December 1991. 

Mikhail Gorbachev was the only person to occupy this office. Gorbachev was also General Secretary of the Communist Party of the Soviet Union between March 1985 and August 1991. He derived an increasingly greater share of his power from his position as president until he finally resigned as General Secretary after the 1991 coup d'état attempt.

Powers
The presidency was an executive post, based on a mixture of the US and French presidencies.

Prior to the creation of the post of president, the de jure head of state of the Soviet Union was the chairman of the Presidium of the Supreme Soviet, who was often called the "president" by non-Soviet sources.  For most of the Soviet Union's existence, all effective executive political power was in the hands of the general secretary of the Communist Party of the Soviet Union, with the chairman of the Presidium exercising largely symbolic and figurehead duties. Starting with Leonid Brezhnev in 1977, the last four general secretaries—Brezhnev, Yuri Andropov, Konstantin Chernenko, and Gorbachev—simultaneously served as de jure head of state during their time in office.

The president was initially elected by the Congress of People's Deputies and served as ex officio chairman of that body, but all future elections were to have been by popular vote. The president reported to the Supreme Soviet. On 24 September 1990, Gorbachev persuaded the Supreme Soviet to give him the power to rule by unrestricted decree (on the economy, law and order, and the appointment of government personnel) until 31 March 1992. Another power was the right to declare direct presidential rule in troubled areas and abolish democratic elected bodies if necessary. During the election of the president several candidates were nominated, among leading contenders were KGB chairman Vadim Bakatin and Premier Nikolai Ryzhkov.

The president's powers were:
 Commander in chief of the armed forces
 The ability to propose and veto legislation
 The ability to appoint the Prime Minister (who would then have to be approved by the Supreme Soviet), or, if necessary, to dismiss the Prime Minister, among other government ministers and officials

 The declaration of states of emergency or martial law within the borders of the Soviet Union
 The nation's top representative abroad, with the ability to sign international treaties
 The ability to call for national referendums on important issues
 The ability to assign military ranks and honorary titles
 The power to restore citizenship to exiles or internal dissidents
 The ability to overrule government decisions that violated the constitution or endangered citizens rights and freedoms
The vice president of the Soviet Union was the deputy head of state. If the president was killed or unable to be in office, the vice president would become president. The only person to hold this office was Gennady Yanayev, who the following year became the leader of the 
Gang of Eight which attempted the August coup, assuming the position of acting president of the Soviet Union on 19 August 1991. After three days the coup collapsed and Gorbachev was restored. 

Following the coup attempt, Gorbachev remained president until the country's dissolution, when he resigned and declared his office to be extinct. The powers of the position were subsequently ceded to the new President of Russia, Boris Yeltsin.

Oath
With his right hand on a red bound copy of the Soviet Constitution, placed on a small table before the Congress, the president-elect (Gorbachev) took the following oath:
"I solemnly swear to faithfully serve the peoples of our nations, to strictly observe the Soviet Constitution, to guarantee the rights and freedoms of citizens and to conscientiously fulfill the high responsibilities placed in me as president of the Soviet Union."

List

History 
Members of the Communist Party voted on establishing a presidency on 7 February 1990. The first and only presidential election took place on 14 March 1990. The Congress of People's Deputies decided that they would elect the first president into a five-year term, then turn over presidential elections to the public beginning in the planned 1995 presidential election.

See also
1990 Soviet Union presidential election
Index of Soviet Union-related articles
List of presidents of Russia
List of heads of state of the Soviet Union
Premier of the Soviet Union
General Secretary of the Communist Party of the Soviet Union
List of leaders of the Soviet Union
President of Russia

Notes

References

Government of the Soviet Union

Mikhail Gorbachev
1990 establishments in the Soviet Union
Perestroika
Titles held only by one person
Soviet Union